Flesh Gordon Meets the Cosmic Cheerleaders (aka Flesh Gordon 2: Flesh Gordon Meets the Cosmic Cheerleaders) is a 1990 sex comedy  film, and the sequel to the sex comedy Flesh Gordon. Like the original, it spoofs the Flash Gordon serials, though the humor is more scatological than the original. Only William Dennis Hunt returns from the original cast.

Plot
On Earth, Flesh is being filmed for an erotic science fiction film. A major mishap occurs on the set and the director fires the whole crew. Flesh is kidnapped by a trio of outer space cheerleaders as he is leaving the set. Dale, Flesh's fiancé, and Doctor Flexi Jerkoff take off in a spaceship to rescue him. The cheerleaders take Flesh to their planet and introduce him to their leader, Robunda Hooters. She tells him that the planet's men have been infected by Evil Presence's “Impotence Radiation”. Flesh is believed to possess “The Virile Force”, so he alone can stop the ray. Evil Presence and Master Bator, Presence's equally-deviant assistant, hear of Flesh's arrival. Presence plans to kidnap him, steal his penis, and become the only virile man in the universe.

Meanwhile, as Dale and Jerkoff feel the effects of the radiation, their spaceship's power reduces and lands on the cheerleaders' planet. While searching for Flesh, they spot the college, “Cosmic High”, and explore it. They find Flesh being seduced into am orgy by the cheerleaders. Dale is devastated to discover Flesh is supposedly cheating on her, while Presence and his crew invade and kidnap Dale. Flesh and Jerkoff hop on a rocketship and race to her rescue.

The cheerleaders start chasing Flesh across the galaxy. Flesh and Jerkoff manage to lose them, but their soon runs out of power and crash-lands on a strange planet surrounded by “Mammary Mountains”, giant lactating breast-shaped hills overdosed with silicon. Jerkoff insists that he and Flesh stay for a while, as he becomes obsessed by the breast-like relics. This changes when the hills lure them to a gay alien. As the pair flee, the cheerleaders land on the planet and spot them hiding in a cave. The alien sticks his genitalia into the cave and ejaculates inside.

Flesh and Jerkoff slide down the cave and enter the “G-Spot”, a milk bar run by voluptuous lactating women, who turn their customers into overgrown babies. Bazonga Bomber, a waitress, serves Jerkoff and Flesh. Though Flesh wisely passes, Jerkoff fails to resist the temptation and gets turned into a baby. The cheerleaders catch up with Flesh and Jerkoff at the milk bar. Robunda and Flesh make amends and Bazonga points to the exit. Jerkoff, Flesh, and Robunda go through a tunnel and notice an unpleasant smell. They soon find its source: a tribe of sentient excrements, known as “The Turd People”, who insist the three should join their clan. The Turd People are about to reincarnate the trio into Turds, but Jerkoff repels them with laxative chewing gum. One of the Turds, Bazonga's long-lost father, informs the trio of Dale's whereabouts and helps them escape on a rocketship he has built.

Flesh, Jerkoff, and Robunda arrive at Evil Presence's palace. Presence and Bator detain them and are about to operate on Flesh, when Robunda's cheerleaders appear. One almost kills Bater, but Flesh spares his life. Flesh then reluctantly accepts Robunda's idea of having sex with Queen Frigid, in a bid to stop the impotence ray. Presence becomes horrified at witnessing this actually happening and starts a fight with Flesh. He turns out to be Flesh's old enemy, Emperor Wang. Bator and Frigid, now sick of Wang's evil ways, help Flesh to stop the impotence ray. Wang forces Flesh into a pit, but falls in with him. They land in a spider's web, and a spider emerges. As it catches Wang, Flesh frees himself and lands on the bottom of the pit. He retrieves a jewelled chest from a Jewish sentinel, makes his way out, and presents it to Frigid. He releases an oversized condom out of the chest, which Bator applies to the phallic impotence ray-gun.

With the ray stopped and the universe's virility restored, the group celebrates. Frigid reunites with Homer, her ex-husband, while Flesh and Dale reconcile. Robunda no longer feels the urge of pursuing Flesh and finds satisfaction in Jerkoff. The heroes state their need to go back home, but Frigid and Homer invite them to their remarriage. Afterward, both parties exchange farewells. While Wang roams the palace grounds in humiliation, the heroes return to Earth.

Reception
Despite gaining a cult following, and selling well on VHS and DVD, the film received very negative reviews from critics.

Cast

Soundtrack
Stuck on You Baby - The Groovaholics and Ian McNeil
The Hero Always Get the Girl - Bruce Scott
The All-American Hero - Rod Knowlan

References

External links

1990s sex comedy films
Canadian sex comedy films
Cheerleading films
1990s science fiction comedy films
English-language Canadian films
1990s English-language films
Films scored by Paul Zaza
Films set on fictional planets
Flash Gordon
1990s parody films
Canadian sequel films
Space adventure films
1990 comedy films
1990 films
1990s Canadian films